The prix Sade is a French literary prize created in 2001, sometimes called the Sade Prize in English, as an homage to the marquis de Sade.

History 
Founded by Lionel Aracil and Frédéric Beigbeder, it is awarded by a jury as a "meeting of authors, publishers and other artists for the celebration of contemporary libertinism," the Sade prize is awarded each year at the end of   September in honor of the "singular author and honest man, according to the definition of his century. An authentic liberal who will have succeeded, beyond the vicissitudes of the Revolution and the hold of the moral order, to undo the shackles of literature as well as those of politics."

The winner receives a work from a contemporary artist, including in recent years Éric Madeleine, Nobuyoshi Araki, Alberto Sorbelli, Fabrice Hybert, and Jean-Paul Gaultier.

Award Winners

Sade Prize 
 2001 - Catherine Millet, The Sexual Life of Catherine M.
 2002 - Alain Robbe-Grillet, Gradiva (C'est Gradiva qui vous appelle)
 2003 - Louis Skorecki, Il entrerait dans la légende
 2005 - Jean Streff, Traité du fétichisme à l'usage des jeunes générations
 2006 - Shozo Numa, Yapou, bétail humain
 2007 - Dennis Cooper, The Sluts
 2008 - Charles Robinson, Génie du proxénétisme
 2009 - Stéphane Velut, Cadence
 2010 - Jacques Chessex, Le Dernier Crâne de M. de Sade
 2011 - Thomas Hairmont, Le Coprophile
 2012 - Christine Angot, Une semaine de vacances - refused by the author
 2013 - Jean-Baptiste Del Amo, Pornographia
 2014 - Alain Guiraudie, Now the Night Begins (Ici commence la nuit)
 2015 - Jean-Noël Orengo, La Fleur du Capital, and Audrée Wilhelmy, Les Sangs
 2016 - Agnès Giard, Un désir d'humain, les Love Doll au Japon
 2017 - Gay Talese, The Voyeur's Motel
 2018 - Jonathan Littell, Une vieille histoire
 2019 - Kevin Lambert, Querelle de Roberval and Christophe Siébert, Métaphysique de la viande
 2020 - Marie-Pier Lafontaine, Chienne
 2021 - Caroline De Mulder, Manger Bambi

Sade Prize for First Novel 
 2001 : Éric Bénier-Bürckel for Un prof bien sous tout rapport, éd. Pétrelle
 2017 : Raphaël Eymery for Pornarina : la-prostituée-à-tête-de-cheval, éd. Denoël

Sade Prize for Non-Fiction 
 2004 : Ruwen Ogien for Penser la pornographie, éd. PUF
 2011 : Paul B. Preciado for Pornotopia: An Essay on Playboy’s Architecture and Biopolitics, éd. Climats

Sade Prize for Works of Art 
 2006 : Jacques Henric and Jorge Amat for Obsessions nocturnes, éditions Édite
 2018 : Mavado Charon  for Dirty, Mania Press
 2019 : Jean-Jacques Lequeu, bâtisseur de fantasmes, Éditions Norma / Bibliothèque Nationale de France (catalogue d'exposition)

Sade Jury Prize 
 2009 : Pierre Bourgeade pour Éloge des fétichistes, éd. Tristram

Sade Prize for Memoirs 
 2012 : Jean-Pierre Bourgeron pour l'édition de trois textes de la collection « Eros singuliers » (éditions HumuS) : L'Aviateur fétichiste (2012), Marthe de Sainte-Anne (2011) et Le Curé travesti (2011)
 2015 : Trois milliards de pervers : grande encyclopédie des homosexualités, réédition de l’édition saisie en 1973 (éditions Acratie)

References

External links 
 Official site of the Prix Sade

Prix Sade
Marquis de Sade